The Legislative Assembly of Kaluga Oblast is the regional parliament of Kaluga Oblast, a federal subject of Russia. A total of 40 deputies are elected for five-year terms.

Elections

2020

References

Kaluga Oblast
Politics of Kaluga Oblast